The participation of Australia in the ABU TV Song Festival has occurred four times since the inaugural ABU TV Song Festival began in 2012. Since their début in 2012, the Australian entry has been organised by the national broadcaster Special Broadcasting Service (SBS). In 2020, Australia withdrew from the festival.

History
SBS is one of the founder members in the ABU TV Song Festivals, having participated in the very first ABU TV Song Festival 2012.

Participation overview

See also 
 Australia in the ABU Radio Song Festival
 Australia in the Eurovision Song Contest
 Australia in the Junior Eurovision Song Contest

References 

Countries at the ABU Song Festival